Aksel Nõmmela (born 22 October 1994) is an Estonian cyclist, who most recently rode for UCI ProTeam .

Major results

2011
 1st Stage 4 Tour de la région de Łódź
 3rd Time trial, National Junior Road Championships
2012
 3rd Time trial, National Junior Road Championships
2015
 2nd Road race, National Under-23 Road Championships
 5th Road race, National Road Championships
 5th La Côte Picarde
2016
 2nd Road race, National Under-23 Road Championships
 4th Road race, National Road Championships
 4th De Kustpijl
 7th Coppa dei Laghi-Trofeo Almar
 7th Grote Prijs Marcel Kint
 8th Road race, UCI Under-23 Road World Championships
 9th Overall Ronde van Midden-Nederland
 9th Ronde van Drenthe
2017
 1st Stage 3b Le Triptyque des Monts et Châteaux
 5th Kampioenschap van Vlaanderen
 7th Road race, UEC European Road Championships
 7th Grand Prix de la ville de Pérenchies
 8th Grand Prix de la ville de Nogent-sur-Oise
 8th Midden–Brabant Poort Omloop
 10th Overall International Tour of Rhodes
2018
 1st Grand Prix Albert Fauville-Baulet
 2nd Antwerp Port Epic
 3rd Heistse Pijl
 3rd PWZ Zuidenveld Tour
 4th Ronde van Midden-Nederland
 5th Omloop Mandel-Leie-Schelde
 5th Grote Prijs Jef Scherens
 5th Ronde van Noord-Holland
 6th Omloop van het Houtland
 7th Grote Prijs Jean-Pierre Monseré
 9th Volta Limburg Classic
 10th Arno Wallaard Memorial
2019
 5th Schaal Sels
 6th Ronde van Drenthe
 8th Grote Prijs Stad Zottegem
 10th Tour de l'Eurométropole
2020
 6th Grand Prix d'Isbergues

References

External links

1994 births
Living people
Estonian male cyclists
European Games competitors for Estonia
Cyclists at the 2015 European Games
Sportspeople from Tallinn